Shurwayne Winchester is a Tobagonian soca musician from The Republic of Trinidad and Tobago, who has twice won the Road March title.

Biography
He was born on 8 February 1974 and was raised in Tobago. When he was 12, he entered the competition arena, consistently making yearly contributions that impressed and propelled him to advanced stages. His ability to both pen lyrics he loved and sing them in tones far beyond what was expected of his age, gave him the fortitude to compete against some of the best in the industry, among them, veterans such as the calypso queen of the world, Denyse Plummer and Calypso Monarchs Cro Cro and Luta.

Winchester has won numerous Calypso Monarch and Road March titles. In 2004, having already made a name for himself with tracks such as "Baby Love" and "Under My Spell", he won the Road March title in 2004 with "The Band Coming". In 2005 he won again with "Dead or Alive".

In 2006 when he won both the Power and Groovy soca Monarch titles with "Can't Wait" and "Don't Stop". He won awards for "Songwriter of the Year", "Song of the Year" (for "Dead or Alive") and "Groovy Soca of the Year" (for "Don’t Stop", his collaboration with Shawn Noel) at the 8th annual Copyright Organisation of Trinidad and Tobago (COTT) awards in 2006.

In 2008 he formed his own band, Y.O.U. (Yes One Unit). Winchester collaborated with Maxi Priest on "Make It Yours" and with Serani on "All I Need".

Discography 
Under My Spell (2002)
Press Play (2004)
Give Thanks (2005)
Evolution (2006)
Adrenaline (2007)
Renaissance (2008)
Y.O.U. (2009)

Collaborations 
 "Rags Don't Care" (featuring Chinese Laundry and Bunji Garlin) (2003)
 "Come Beta" (featuring Destra Garcia) (2004)
 "Don’t Waste Water" (featuring Bunji Garlin) (2005)
 "Give Thanks" (featuring Maximus Dan) (2005)
 "Tempo" (featuring Calypso Rose) (2006)
 "Move With Us" (featuring Bunji Garlin and Machel Montano) (2006)
 "Woman By My Side" (featuring Peter Ram) (2007)
 "Adrenaline" (featuring Elephant Man) (2007)
 "Poody" (featuring JMC 3Veni) (2007)
 "Give It To Me" (featuring Natalie Wilson (2007)
 "Hard Work" (featuring Mr Slaughter) (2008)
 "Whole Day" (featuring Johnny King) (2008)
 "Loving Again" (featuring Nadia Batson) (2008)
 "Allequa" (featuring Collie Buddz) (2008)
 "Traffic" (featuring Berbice) (2008)
 "Elevator" (featuring Shazelle) (2008)
 "Make It Yours" (featuring Maxi Priest) (2009)
 "All I Need" (featuring Serani)(2009)
 "Rough Wine" (featuring Bad Gyal Ce'Cile) (2009)
 "Road Calling" (featuring Skinny Fabulous) (2011)

References

External links
Official website
Trini Jungle Juice profile
CDBaby profile

1974 births
Living people
21st-century Trinidad and Tobago male singers
21st-century Trinidad and Tobago singers
Soca musicians